Benjamin Franklin Martin (October 2, 1828January 20, 1895) was a nineteenth-century politician, lawyer and teacher from Virginia and West Virginia.

Born near Farmington, Virginia (now West Virginia), Martin graduated from Allegheny College in Meadville, Pennsylvania in 1854 and taught school in Fairmont, Virginia (now West Virginia). He studied law and was admitted to the bar, commencing practice in March 1856. He moved to Pruntytown, Virginia (now West Virginia) in 1856 and was a member of the West Virginia Constitutional Convention in 1872 and a delegate to the Democratic National Convention in 1872 and 1888. Martin was elected a Democrat to the United States House of Representatives in 1876, serving from 1877 to 1881, unsuccessful for renomination in 1880. He resumed practicing law in Grafton, West Virginia until his death there on January 20, 1895. He was interred in Woodlawn Cemetery in Fairmont, West Virginia.

External links

1828 births
1895 deaths
Allegheny College alumni
Virginia lawyers
West Virginia lawyers
People from Grafton, West Virginia
People from Farmington, West Virginia
Lawyers from Fairmont, West Virginia
Burials at Woodlawn Cemetery (Fairmont, West Virginia)
Democratic Party members of the United States House of Representatives from West Virginia
19th-century American politicians
19th-century American lawyers
Politicians from Fairmont, West Virginia